Stephanie Main (born 20 September 1976) is a British former competitive figure skater. She is a three-time British national champion (1994, 1996, 1999) and five-time Scottish national champion. Stephanie also competed in the first ever winter European Youth Olympic Festival held in Aosta 1993. She placed 22nd at the 1996 World Championships. She also competed twice at the European Championships.

Main did not compete in the 1996–97 and 1997–98 seasons. Returning to competition, she won her third national title in the 1998–99 season. In March 1999, she injured knee ligaments, causing her to withdraw from the 1999 World Championships in Helsinki, Finland.

Stephanie Main has trained with coaches nationally and internationally, including the Broadmoor Skating Club in Colorado Springs and the Mariposa School of Skating in Canada.

Programs

Competitive highlights

References 

1976 births
British female single skaters
Living people
Sportspeople from Edinburgh
Scottish female single skaters